Sansabelt is a brand of men's trousers. The trousers have a wide webbed elastic band sewn into the waist, which is intended to make a belt or suspenders unnecessary, hence the name sans a belt.  The slacks come in a classic fit with roomy legs in a dressy or dress casual fabric.  Sansabelt slacks come in 3 styles—Western top pockets with flat front, Side pockets with flat front and Pleated with side pockets.

History
The Sansabelt slack was invented by Edward Singer of Silver Manufacturing Company, located in East Chicago, Indiana, which subsequently sold the company and their patent to Jaymar-Ruby, an Indiana-based clothing company, in 1959. Jaymar-Ruby's Sansabelt brand was acquired by Hartmarx in 1967 and the last Sansabelt pants were produced in the early 1990s. On 24 January 2009, Hartmarx Corporation filed for Chapter 11 bankruptcy. Peter Schwadel, President of Monte Blue, Inc. purchased the license to Sansabelt in February 2013.

References in popular culture
On the American television Good Eats episode "Ear Apparent," when making creamed corn, host Alton Brown remarks "Back before the days when I started seriously eyeing the Sansabelt pants rack, I used to put lots of cream in here. Sometimes a quart for one batch." In episode "Mussel Bound" he says "But I gotta tell ya, I'm already Sansabelt challenged here, (...)" when explaining why he is not going to use butter or cream to thicken a sauce.

In the movie Ferris Bueller's Day Off, a Jaymar/Sansabelt store can be seen in the background at the end of the parade scene.

In the first episode of Wings, Brian Hackett makes fun of rival airline owner Roy Biggins (David Schramm),"...Sansabelt slacks! Boy, you miss one issue of GQ..."

In the Janet Evanovich book Plum Lucky, the narrator states "They were middle-aged thugs, dressed in bowling shirts and Sansabelt slacks. Their hair was slicked back. Their shoes were scuffed and run down at the heel. Their guns weren't as big as ours."

In the Roseanne episode "The Fifties Show," Becky tells her father Dan (played by John Goodman), "Thanks, daddy, you're the best." Roseanne replies, "That's why he wears the Sansabelts in this family."

In the Seinfeld episode The Big Salad, we see a news broadcast about fictional former baseball player Steve Gendason who kills dry-cleaner Bobby Pinkus, allegedly over a pair of stained Sansabelt slacks.

In the fashion-parody film Zoolander, Derek (Ben Stiller) learns that male models throughout history have been brainwashed into committing many high-profile murders.  He is told that the assassination of U.S. President John F. Kennedy was due in part by JFK's involvement in the Cuban trade embargo, which "halted the shipment of Cuban-manufactured Sansabelt slacks, a very popular item at the time."

In episode six of season two of Harvey Birdman, Peanut comments on George Jetson's Sansabelt pants.

See also
 Zubaz

References

 Jaymar-Ruby Inc at MacREA's Blue Book (dot) com
US Patent 2,806,225 for Waistband Construction, granted to Edward Singer, September 17, 1957

External links
 

Clothing brands of the United States
Trousers and shorts